This article provides details of international football games played by the Hungary national football team from 1950 to 1969. The national team earned a reputation during this time period as one of the most feared national teams in history.

Results

1950

1951

1952

1953

1954

1955

1956

1957

1958

1959

1960

1961

1962

1963

1964

1965

1966

1967

1968

1969

References 

Football in Hungary
Hungary national football team results
1950s in Hungarian sport
1960s in Hungarian sport